Culbertson–Head Farmstead is a historic home, farm, and national historic district located near Palmyra, Marion County, Missouri. The house was built about 1854–1855, and is a two-story, "L"-shaped, Greek Revival style brick dwelling. It features a two-story front portico. Also on the property are the contributing smokehouse / ice house (pre-1915); shop (c. 1927); large Jamesway, gambrel roof barn (1927); gabled roofed, wood granary (corn crib) (ca. 1927); and transverse crib barn (1880s).

It was added to the National Register of Historic Places in 1982.

References

Historic districts on the National Register of Historic Places in Missouri
Farms on the National Register of Historic Places in Missouri
Greek Revival houses in Missouri
Houses completed in 1855
Buildings and structures in Marion County, Missouri
National Register of Historic Places in Marion County, Missouri